Aaron Pitchkolan (born March 14, 1983, in Aurora, Colorado) is a retired American soccer player and coach.

Career

College
Pitchkolan played high school soccer at Regis Jesuit High School in Aurora. He also featured for club sides Real Colorado and Cherry Creek Lightning and his local Olympic Development team. He began his college career at University of Tampa where he played in 19 games as a freshman and helped the team win the NCAA Division II championship.  Pitchkolan transferred to West Virginia University where he played in 54 games scoring 11 goals over three seasons. In the college offseason, Pitchkolan played in the USL Premier Development League for Boulder Rapids Reserve.

Professional
Pitchkolan was bypassed in the 2005 MLS SuperDraft and had to wait until the second round of the Supplemental Draft to be selected. Pitchkolan appeared in his first MLS game on May 15, 2005, as a substitute for Carey Talley in a game against the Colorado Rapids. His first goal came a game later on May 22, 2005, in a 5–2 win against Chivas USA. In all, Pitchkolan played in 20 games scoring 3 goals in his first MLS season. In 2006, Pitchkolan featured in only 10 games, all as a substitute, and playing a total of 94 minutes for the first team. A highlight of his season was his stoppage time winner against the Kansas City Wizards on April 23, 2006, in a match that ended 3–2. In 2007, Pitchkolan made the transition to center back, a position he occasionally played in college. He made 16 appearances, 11 as starts, but did not score any goals. In 2008, he played 21 games, starting in nine and scored one goal. He was used as cover for Dallas' veteran defender, Duilio Davino.  Aaron was one of three players to be active for all 30 regular season games along with Kenny Cooper and Dominic Oduro. Pitch was left unprotected for the 2008 MLS Expansion Draft, but he was not selected.

On April 28, 2009, FC Dallas traded Pitchkolan to the San Jose Earthquakes for a conditional pick in the 2011 MLS SuperDraft, but was later put on waivers on March 4, 2010.

He subsequently signed for the Rochester Rhinos of the USSF Division 2 Professional League in April 2010. On February 25, 2011, it was announced that the Puerto Rico Islanders had acquired his rights from the Rhinos.

In January 2013, Pitchkolan was signed by Minnesota United FC. With a header to feed Lucas Rodriguez, Pitchkolan recorded the club's first assist on April 20 against FC Edmonton. The next week, he scored his first goal with Minnesota, a game-winner in a 3-2 victory at Atlanta. Pitchkolan scored two goals and contributed one assist in 2013, playing 1,665 minutes with 20 appearances for Minnesota. He was named to the NASL Best XI in 2013 for playing a key role on the defense and was selected to the NASL Team of The Week three times throughout the year.

Honors

Rochester Rhinos
USSF D-2 Pro League Regular Season Champions (1): 2010

Individual
USSF D-2 Pro League Best XI (1): 2010

References

External links

1983 births
Living people
Sportspeople from Aurora, Colorado
Soccer players from Colorado
American soccer players
Association football defenders
Association football midfielders
Tampa Spartans men's soccer players
West Virginia Mountaineers men's soccer players
Colorado Rapids U-23 players
FC Dallas players
San Jose Earthquakes players
Rochester New York FC players
Puerto Rico Islanders players
San Antonio Scorpions players
Minnesota United FC (2010–2016) players
USL League Two players
Major League Soccer players
USSF Division 2 Professional League players
North American Soccer League players
FC Dallas draft picks
American people of Polish descent
American expatriate soccer players
Expatriate footballers in Puerto Rico